Moaiad Abdeen Maki (born 21 May 1996) is a Sudanese footballer who plays as a right back for Al-Amal Atbara and the Sudan national team.

References

External links

1996 births
Living people
Sudanese footballers
People from River Nile (state)
Association football fullbacks
Alamal SC Atbara players
El Hilal SC El Obeid players
Al-Hilal Club (Omdurman) players
Sudan international footballers
2021 Africa Cup of Nations players
Sudan A' international footballers
2022 African Nations Championship players